The East Deboyne Islands are a group of scattered island and reefs between the Deboyne Islands and the Renard Islands, in the north of the Louisiade Archipelago, Papua New Guinea. 
Panaeati Islanders have a Copra plantation on Mabui island.

Geography

History
The islands were discovered in 1793 by Antoine Bruni d'Entrecasteaux.

References

Atolls of Papua New Guinea
Archipelagoes of Papua New Guinea
Islands of Milne Bay Province
Louisiade Archipelago